John Savile, 1st Baron Savile,  (6 January 1818 – 28 November 1896), was a British diplomat who served as Ambassador to Italy from 1883 to 1888.

Born John Lumley-Savile, he was the eldest of the five illegitimate children of John Lumley-Savile, 8th Earl of Scarbrough and the grandson of John Lumley-Savile, 7th Earl of Scarbrough. The latter had succeeded to the Savile estates through his grandmother Barbara Savile, sister and heiress of Sir George Savile, 8th and last Baronet, of Thornhill (see the Marquess of Halifax) and wife of Richard Lumley-Saunderson, 4th Earl of Scarbrough. Lumley-Savile's mother was of French origin. 

Lumley-Savile served as Attaché at the British embassies in Berlin from 1842 to 1849, in St Petersburg from 1849 to 1854 and as Secretary of Legation in Washington from 1854 to 1858, in Madrid from 1858 to 1860 and in Constantinople in 1860. The latter year, he was appointed Secretary to the Embassy in St Petersburg, in which post he remained until 1868. While in Russia he was made a member of the Russian Imperial Academy in 1866. He summarized some results of his extensive research on Russia's tea trade in an extensive report which he presented to the British Parliament.

Lumley-Savile later served as Envoy Extraordinary and Minister Plenipotentiary to Saxony from 1866 to 1867. He was then Envoy Extraordinary and Minister Plenipotentiary to the Swiss Confederation until 1868, when he was transferred to Belgium until 1883. The latter year he was admitted to the Privy Council and appointed Ambassador to Italy, a post he held until 1888.

In 1887, he succeeded to the Savile estates in Nottinghamshire and Yorkshire on the death of his younger brother, Augustus, and the same year he assumed by Royal licence the surname of Savile in lieu of Lumley. The following year he was raised to the peerage as Baron Savile, of Rufford in the County of Nottingham, with remainder to his nephew John Savile Lumley (later Lumley-Savile). Lord Savile died in November 1896, aged 78. He was succeeded in the Barony according to the special remainder by his nephew John Savile Lumley-Savile, 2nd Baron Savile. Savile was laid to rest at St Margaret's Church, Bilsthorpe in Nottinghamshire.

See also
Earl of Scarbrough
Marquess of Halifax
Rufford Abbey

Notes

References 
Kidd, Charles, Williamson, David (editors). Debrett's Peerage and Baronetage (1990 edition). New York: St Martin's Press, 1990, 

1818 births
1896 deaths
Barons in the Peerage of the United Kingdom
Diplomatic peers
Ambassadors of the United Kingdom to Belgium
Knights Grand Cross of the Order of the Bath
Members of the Privy Council of the United Kingdom
Peers of the United Kingdom created by Queen Victoria